Muhammetnazar Gapurowiç Gapurow (15 February 192213 July 1999) was a Turkmen politician who has served as the first secretary of the Communist Party of the Turkmen SSR from 1969 until 1985. He spent his entire career in the Komsomol and Communist Party apparatus, becoming the republic's most influential politician for almost two decades in the Brezhnev era.

Early life and career

Gapurow was born in a small village close to Charjou, Charjou Oblast (now Türkmenabat, Lebap Province). In December 1941 he was drafted into the army, serving as the commander of a gunners section in the 88th Separate Rifle Brigade of the Central Asian Military District. From 1941 to 1944 he was on active duty in the Red Army during World War II. In 1948, Gapurow joined the Communist Party nomenklatura as head of the Propaganda Department at the district level in Charjou oblast and gradually climbed the party ladder. He graduated from the Pedagogical Institute in Ashkhabad in 1954. From 1951 to 1955 he worked as first secretary of the Komsomol organisation, and later he held various party posts before assuming the republic's leadership.

Leadership of Turkmenistan

In 1969, he was appointed first secretary of the Communist Party of the Turkmen SSR. During his time in office, the republic received considerable investment in its modernisation of the gas and oil sectors, and living standards rose significantly for the general population. However, excessive centralised control over economic development and macroeconomic mismanagement led to a stagnation of economic growth in most sectors of the republic's economy in the late 1970s and early 1980s. Gapurow's era also witnessed further growth in nepotism, regional rivalries and corruption.

In 1985, incoming General Secretary Mikhail Gorbachev removed Gapurow from his post due to a cotton-related corruption scandal and sent him into retirement.

Later life
He never returned to the political arena and held several minor positions in the late 1980s. He authored several books and articles during the Soviet era, mainly on Communist Party and Turkmenistan development issues. In the 1990s he began writing his memoirs but left them unfinished when he died on 13 July 1999. He was known to have one son, Batyr, who died in September 2015 at the age of 61 of cardiac arrest.

Notes

References

Sources
Abazov, Rafis. Historical Dictionary of Turkmenistan, p. 64-5. Scarecrow Press, 2005, .

External links
Rulers of Soviet Republics
Russian biographies project

Soviet military personnel of World War II
1922 births
1999 deaths
People from Türkmenabat
First secretaries of the Communist Party of Turkmenistan
Central Committee of the Communist Party of the Soviet Union members
Recipients of the Order of Lenin
Recipients of the Order of the Red Banner of Labour
Sixth convocation members of the Soviet of Nationalities
Seventh convocation members of the Soviet of the Union
Eighth convocation members of the Soviet of the Union
Ninth convocation members of the Soviet of the Union
Tenth convocation members of the Soviet of the Union
Eleventh convocation members of the Soviet of the Union
Heads of government of the Turkmen Soviet Socialist Republic
People's commissars and ministers of the Turkmen Soviet Socialist Republic